Uronen Precision (UP), full name Ase ja Osa Ky, is a Finnish firearms manufacturer based in Lohja, Finland. They primarily are known for their high performance competition AR-15 clones called UR-15.

References

External links 
The official Facebook page of Uronen Precision
Official discussion board of Uronen Precision

Firearm manufacturers of Finland
Privately held companies of Finland